Chicken snake may refer to:

 Pantherophis alleghaniensis, the eastern rat snake, a  nonvenomous colubrid found in North America
 Pantherophis guttatus, the corn snake, a  nonvenomous colubrid found in North America
 Pantherophis obsoletus, the black rat snake, a  nonvenomous colubrid found in North America
 Pantherophis spiloides, the gray rat snake, a  nonvenomous colubrid found in North America
 Pituophis m. melanoleucus, the northern pine snake, a  nonvenomous colubrid found in North America

Animal common name disambiguation pages